The following is a timeline of the history of the city of Goma, Democratic Republic of the Congo.

19th century

1890s - Goma occupied by agents of the Congo Free State as a trading post to control traffic on Lake Kivu; previously a way point for lake traffic and a crossroads for the overland trade routes between Central Africa and the Indian Ocean.

20th century

 1910 - Goma confirmed as a Belgian possession in the Convention on the Lakes signed  in Brussels on 14 May 1910 by plenipotentiaries of Belgium, Germany, and Great Britain.
 1925 - Albert National Park established near Goma.
 1959 - Roman Catholic Diocese of Goma founded.
 1962 - Benezeth Moley becomes governor.(fr)
 1984 - Population: 77,908.
 1988 - Goma becomes part of newly formed North Kivu province.
 1993 - University of Goma established.
 1994
 Population: 161,956.
 July: 850,000 Rwandan war refugees flee to Goma.
 1996 - 2 November: Goma taken by Alliance of Democratic Forces for the Liberation of Congo.
 1998 - 2 August: City taken by forces of Rally for Congolese Democracy–Goma.
 2000
 Yole!Africa cultural centre established.
 Eugène Serufuli Ngayabaseka becomes governor of North Kivu province.(fr)

21st century
 2002 - January: Mount Nyiragongo erupts, destroys nearly half of city structures.
 2004 - Population: 249,862 (estimate).
 2006
  (school) founded.
 Salaam Kivu International Film Festival begins.
 2007
 "New military operations centre for the FARDC" established. 
 Julien Paluku Kahongya becomes governor of North Kivu province.
 2008
 January: International peace conference held in Goma.
 15 April: Airplane crash occurs.
 October: "Chaos grips...Goma as rebel forces advance."
 2009
 August: US secretary of state visits Goma.
 Roger Rachid Tumbala becomes mayor (approximate date).
 2011 - Jean Busanga Malihaseme appointed mayor.
 2012
 July:  begins.
 20 November: M23 forces take Goma.
 12 December: Prison break.
 Kubuya Ndoole Naso becomes mayor.
 2013

 February: The first annual Amani Festival for peace takes place.
 4 March: Airplane crash occurs.
 August: Heavy fighting occurs outside Goma during the M23 rebellion.
 2015
 January: 2015 Congolese protests.
 June: Airport taken by "Mai-Mai fighters."
 Dieudonné Malere becomes mayor.
 Population: 368,165 (estimate).
 2016 - November: United Nations forces attacked by bomb.
 2022 - Festival Amani returns after a year's absence due to the COVID-19 pandemic.

See also
 Goma history
 List of mayors of Goma
 Timelines of other cities in DR Congo: Bukavu, Kinshasa, Kisangani, Lubumbashi

References

This article incorporates information from the Catalan Wikipedia, Dutch Wikipedia, and French Wikipedia.

Bibliography

External links

  (Bibliography)
  (Bibliography)
 Items related to Goma, various dates (via Europeana)
 Items related to Goma, various dates (via Digital Public Library of America)

Images

Goma
Goma
History of the Democratic Republic of the Congo
Democratic Republic of the Congo history-related lists
Years in the Democratic Republic of the Congo